There are thirty-six states in Nigeria.  Eight states are in Yorubaland.

This is a list of States of Nigeria located in Yorubaland
 Oyo State
 Ogun State
 Kwara State
 Lagos State
 Osun State
 Ondo State
 Ekiti State
 Kogi State

See also
Yoruba Tribal Marks

Notes

References

States in Yorubaland